Gandolfi is an Italian surname, from a Lombardic given name Gundulf.

People named Gandolfi
 Ubaldo Gandolfi (1728–1781), an Italian painter
 Gaetano Gandolfi (1734–1802), an Italian painter
 Mauro Gandolfi (1764–1834), an Italian painter and printmaker
 Democrito Gandolfi (1797–1874), an Italian sculptor
 Louis Gandolfi (1864-1932), founder of the Gandolfi Field camera company
 Sauveur Gandolfi-Scheit (born 1947), a member of the National Assembly of France
 Michael Gandolfi (born 1956), an American composer of contemporary classical music
 Javier Gandolfi (born 1980), an Argentine football defender

In popular culture
 Rinaldo Gandolfi, a character in the video game Castlevania: Lament of Innocence

See also
Gandolf
Castel Gandolfo

Italian-language surnames